The Satulah Mountain Historic District is a residential historic district in Highlands, North Carolina.  It is located in the southwestern part of the city, bounded on the north and west by Walhalla Road, on the east by properties on Satulah Road.  The area is located on the slopes of Satulah Mountain, and was most significantly developed in the early decades of the 20th century, although the earliest development took place not long after Highlands was founded in 1875.  There are a number of log houses, and rustic styling using log and fieldstone elements is common in the area.  Many houses have Craftsman features.

The district was listed on the National Register of Historic Places in 1995.

See also
National Register of Historic Places listings in Macon County, North Carolina

References

Historic districts in Macon County, North Carolina
Historic districts on the National Register of Historic Places in North Carolina
National Register of Historic Places in Macon County, North Carolina